, or , is the standard time zone in Japan, 9 hours ahead of UTC (UTC+09:00). Japan does not observe daylight saving time, though its introduction has been debated on several occasions. During World War II, the time zone was often referred to as Tokyo Standard Time.

Japan Standard Time is equivalent to Korean Standard Time, Pyongyang Time (North Korea), Eastern Indonesia Standard Time, East-Timorese Standard Time and Yakutsk Time (Russia).

History
Before the Meiji era (1868–1912), each local region had its own time zone in which noon was when the sun was exactly at its culmination. As modern transportation methods, such as trains, were adopted, this practice became a source of confusion. For example, there is a difference of about 5 degrees longitude between Tokyo and Osaka and because of this, a train that departed from Tokyo would arrive at Osaka 20 minutes behind the time in Tokyo. In 1886, Ordinance 51 was issued in response to this problem, which stated:

In the ordinance, the first clause mentions GMT, the second defines east longitude and west longitude and the third says the standard time zone would be in effect from 1888. The city of Akashi in Hyōgo Prefecture is located exactly on 135 degrees east longitude and subsequently became known as Toki no machi (Town of Time).

While Korea came under Japanese rule in 1910, Korea Standard Time of GMT+08:30 continued to be used until 1912, when it was changed to Central Standard Time.

Western Standard Time, which was used in Taiwan and some parts of Okinawa, was abolished by Ordinance 529 in 1937 and replaced by Central Standard Time in those areas. Territories occupied by Japan during World War II, including Singapore and Malaya, adopted Japan Standard Time for the duration of their occupation, but reverted after Japan's surrender.

Between 1948 and 1951 occupied Japan observed daylight saving time (DST) from the first Saturday in May at 24:00 to the second Saturday in September at 24:00 (with the exception of 1949, when the spring forward transition was the first Saturday in April at 24:00). More recently there have been efforts to restore daylight saving time in Japan but these have not succeeded.

In May 2013, former Tokyo governor Naoki Inose proposed permanently moving the country’s time zone ahead by 2 hours to better align global markets and make Japan’s stock market to be the first to open in the world at any given time.

Time zones of the Japanese Empire
The two-time-zone system was implemented in Japan between January 1896 and September 1937:

From October 1937, Central Standard Time was also used in western Okinawa and Taiwan.

IANA time zone database
The IANA time zone database contains one zone for Japan in the file zone.tab, named Asia/Tokyo.

Daylight saving time in Japan

From 1948 to 1952, Japan observed daylight saving time (DST) between May and September every year. The United States imposed this policy as part of the Allied occupation of Japan. In 1952, three weeks before the occupation ended, the Japanese government, which had been granted increased powers, abolished daylight saving time, and the Allied occupation authorities did not interfere. Since then, DST has never been officially implemented nationwide in Japan.

Starting in the late 1990s, a movement to reinstate DST in Japan gained some popularity, aiming at saving energy and increasing recreational time. The Hokkaido region is particularly in favour of this movement because daylight starts as early as 03:30 (in standard time) there in summer due to its high latitude and its location near the eastern edge of the time zone, with much of the region's solar time actually closer to UTC+10:00. Because of this, the sun sets shortly after 19:00 in much of the eastern part of the country (in Tokyo, the latest sunset of the entire year is 19:01, from 26 June to 1 July, despite being at 35°41'N latitude). Since 2000, a few local governments and commerce departments have promoted unmandated hour-earlier work schedule experiments during the summer without officially resetting clocks.

The Council on Economic and Fiscal Policy of the Cabinet Office is expected(written October 2013) to propose that the Japanese government begin studying DST in an attempt to help combat global warming. Japanese Prime Minister Shinzō Abe made a significant effort to introduce daylight saving time, but was ultimately unsuccessful. However, it is not clear that DST would conserve energy in Japan. A 2007 simulation estimated that introducing DST to Japan would increase energy use in Osaka residences by 0.13%, with a 0.02% saving due to lighting more than outweighed by a 0.15% increase due to cooling costs; the simulation did not examine non-residential buildings.

See also
Japanese calendar
Japanese clock
JJY
UTC+09:00

References

External links
 

Time in Japan
Time zones